Tercera División B de Chile (Third Division B of Chile), is the fifth category of Chilean football (soccer) in the Liga Chilena de Fútbol, and is organized by the Federación de Fútbol de Chile and the Asociación Nacional de Fútbol Amateur de Chile. It is both the fifth level of the Chilean football league system and the second league for Chilean Football Youth Leagues.

History 
The Cuarta División de Chile was founded in 1983, being the continuation of Campeonato Regional Zona Central,
and was disbanded in late 2003. It returned in 2009 with its name changed to Tercera División B.

Currently, 18 teams participate on the 2014-15 season. The winner and the runner-up of the league is promoted to Tercera División.

Cuarta División / Tercera B champions

As fourth level of the Chilean League system

As fifth level of the Chilean League system

Titles by Team

External links
Official website

5
1983 establishments in Chile